Congested Districts Board may refer to: 

Congested Districts Board for Ireland
Congested Districts Board (Scotland)